Krista M. Donaldson  (born 1973) is a Canadian–American engineer. She is the CEO of D-Rev, a product design and engineering company that specialises in products for less industrialised countries.

Early life and education
Born and raised in Halifax, Nova Scotia, Donaldson attended Queen Elizabeth High School before earning her engineering degrees from Vanderbilt University and Stanford University.

Career
Prior to D-Rev, Donaldson was an economic officer at the US Department of State where she worked on economic policy and the reconstruction of Iraq's electricity sector, and as a design engineer at KickStart in Nairobi, Kenya. In 2009, Donaldson was recruited by Jim Patell to join D-Rev, a non-profit product design and engineering company that specialises in products for less industrialised countries. As the CEO of D-Rev, she oversaw the launch of their products Brilliance, a treatment for neonatal jaundice and a prosthetic knee for amputees. As a result, she was named one of Silicon Valley Business Journal's 40 Under 40 in 2011 and honoured by Vanderbilt University with their International Alumni Professional Achievement Award.

Notes

References

External links

Living people
1973 births
American women chief executives
Vanderbilt University alumni
Stanford University School of Engineering alumni
American nonprofit chief executives
American technology chief executives
People from Halifax, Nova Scotia